Tatsiana Mikalayewna Karatkevich (Taraškievica: Тацяна Мікалаеўна Караткевіч, Taciana Mikalajeŭna Karatkievič; ; born 8 March 1977 in Minsk) is a Belarusian politician, member of civic campaign Tell the Truth. She was a candidate for the 2015 presidential election.

External links 

 Biography on the «Tell the Truth»
 

1977 births
Candidates for President of Belarus
Politicians from Minsk
Living people
21st-century Belarusian women politicians
21st-century Belarusian politicians
Maxim Tank Belarusian State Pedagogical University alumni